Anthony D. Richards was an English footballer who played in the Football League for The Wednesday.

References

Date of birth unknown
Date of death unknown
English footballers
Association football forwards
English Football League players
Stourbridge F.C. players
Sheffield Wednesday F.C. players